Sir Thomas Wharton Academy is a coeducational academy school and sixth form located in Edlington, Doncaster, England. It accepts pupils from the surrounding areas including Balby, Braithwell, Conisbrough, Edlington, Loversall, Micklebring, Tickhill, Wadworth, Warmsworth and Woodfield Plantation.

Its feeder schools are Warmsworth Primary, Edlington Hilltop, Edlington Victoria, Wadworth Primary, Tickhill Estfeld and Tickhill St Mary's.

Sir Thomas Wharton Academy operates a tutor group system. In the past groups contained pupils of their age group (year group) these were then split into each house Chatsworth Wentworth Cusworth and brodsworth, but in 2009 new tutor groups were formed which included two to four members of each year house, including members of the Sixth Form. Form groups were then changed again at the start of the 2014 school year to include only students up to Year 11. Sixth Form students now have their own specialised form groups. Then in 2017, Form Groups were changed again for Year 11 students to have their own Form Groups.

The school operates a house system, introduced at the same time as mixed age tutor groups. All pupils and members of staff are separated into one of four houses. Each house has its own pastoral care team which deals with student issues. The four houses are named after country halls:  Cusworth (Purple), Brodsworth (Green), Chatsworth (Yellow) and Wentworth (Red). Different coloured ties are used to identify to which house students belong.

History 
The school opened as Edlington Comprehensive School in 1967. It later became simply Edlington School. It was rebuilt and renamed Sir Thomas Wharton Community College in January 2009. The school became a cooperative foundation school in March 2010. The school gained academy status in February 2013. The school was given a 'fresh start' in April 2017: it ceased to be a cooperative school in order to join the Maltby Learning Trust and became known as Sir Thomas Wharton Academy. The Maltby Learning Trust is a Multi-Academy Trust with Maltby Academy, Maltby Redwood Academy, Maltby Lilly Hall Academy, Ravenfield Primary Academy and Maltby Manor Academy as partners.

References 

Secondary schools in Doncaster
Academies in Doncaster